Camellia chinmeii is an endemic species of small evergreen tree. It is of the genus Camellia (Chinese: 茶花; pinyin: cháhuā, literally: "tea flower") of flowering plants in the family Theaceae. C. chinmeii has sessile flowers, six to ten perules, four or five white, early deciduous petals, yellow radiating stamens that are separate to nearly-separate to the base, style 6–7 mm in length and fused 1/2 to 2/3 from the base, densely tomentose ovary. The globose fruit is with beaked or unbeaked capsule.

Distribution and Ecology
The species is endemic to Taiwan. Camellia chinmeii occurs mainly in mountainous areas, with elevations of between 2000 and 2350 m on gentle slopes in the forests on Mt. Weishangshan, Nantou County, in central Taiwan.

Etymology
The specific epithet, chinmeii, derives from the name of Ms. Chin-Mei Hung, who first recognized Camellia chinmeii as a new taxon in 2010.

References

chinmeii
Flora of Taiwan
Trees of Taiwan
Endemic flora of Taiwan